Emily Crane (born February 22, 1994) is an American softball player. She attended Troy Buchanan High School in Troy, Missouri. She later attended the University of Missouri, where she was an All-American for the Missouri Tigers softball team. She later went on to play professional softball with the Chicago Bandits of National Pro Fastpitch.

References

External links

Missouri bio
USA Softball Bio
Chicago Bandits Bio

1994 births
Softball players from Missouri
Living people
People from Troy, Missouri
Missouri Tigers softball players
Chicago Bandits players